Thomas G. Andrews (1882–1942), a native of Orangeburg, South Carolina, also known as Thomas Galpin Andrews, was born to John D. Andrews and Belle (nee Darby) Andrews on August 29, 1882. In 1904, he married Adelphia Wohlgematt, who died in 1928.

Andrews became a lawyer and moved to Oklahoma in 1911. He served as city attorney in Stroud, Oklahoma, where he resided from 1911 to 1918. In 1919 he moved to Chandler, where he was city attorney and also Lincoln County, Oklahoma attorney from 1922 to 1929. He served as a justice of the Oklahoma state supreme court (1925-1935). Harlow's 1930 book lists him under Lincoln County at that time.

He married Reba Myers in 1930.

Thomas died at his home in Oklahoma City on September 10, 1942.

Andrews belonged to the Disciples of Christ church. He also was a member of the American Bar Association; Phi Delta Phi; Freemasons; Knights Templar; Shriners; Odd Fellows and Lions.

Notes

References

External links 
 "Andrews, Thomas Galphin (sic)." In: Makers of Government in Oklahoma. 1930. Victor E. Harlow, ed., p. 344. Harlow Publishing Co. Oklahoma City.

1882 births
1942 deaths
Oklahoma lawyers
Justices of the Oklahoma Supreme Court
People from Orangeburg, South Carolina
People from Oklahoma City
U.S. state supreme court judges admitted to the practice of law by reading law
20th-century American judges
20th-century American lawyers